This article is about the particular significance of the year 1779 to Wales and its people.

Incumbents
Lord Lieutenant of Anglesey - Sir Nicholas Bayly, 2nd Baronet
Lord Lieutenant of Brecknockshire and Monmouthshire – Charles Morgan of Dderw
Lord Lieutenant of Caernarvonshire - Thomas Wynn
Lord Lieutenant of Cardiganshire – Wilmot Vaughan, 1st Earl of Lisburne
Lord Lieutenant of Carmarthenshire – George Rice (until 3 August) Thomas Johnes (from 7 September)
Lord Lieutenant of Denbighshire - Richard Myddelton  
Lord Lieutenant of Flintshire - Sir Roger Mostyn, 5th Baronet 
Lord Lieutenant of Glamorgan – John Stuart, Lord Mountstuart
Lord Lieutenant of Merionethshire - Sir Watkin Williams-Wynn, 4th Baronet
Lord Lieutenant of Montgomeryshire – George Herbert, 2nd Earl of Powis
Lord Lieutenant of Pembrokeshire – Sir Hugh Owen, 5th Baronet
Lord Lieutenant of Radnorshire – Edward Harley, 4th Earl of Oxford and Earl Mortimer

Bishop of Bangor – John Moore
Bishop of Llandaff – Shute Barrington
Bishop of St Asaph – Jonathan Shipley
Bishop of St Davids – James Yorke (until 2 August); John Warren (from 19 September)

Events
February - Ship's surgeon David Samwell witnesses the death of Captain James Cook in Hawaii.
June - Valentine Morris, governor of St Vincent, negotiates unfavourable surrender terms with the French.
unknown dates
New bridges are built over the River Wye at Builth Wells and River Towy at Llandeilo.
Haverfordwest prison is built on the site of the former castle.
Baptist Assembly at Glynceiriog.
Robert Jones, Calvinistic Methodist exhorter, preaches in London.

Arts and literature

New books
David William - Joy in the Tents of Zion (English edition)

Music
Richard Morris creates a list of "Henwau Mesurau Cerdd Dafod a Thant a arferir yn gyffredinol gan y Prydyddion a'r Telynorion yng Nghymru.

Births
14 March - William Ormsby-Gore, politician (died 1860)
24 August - Charles Norris, artist (died 1858)

Deaths
June/July - Hugh Williams, Anglican clergyman and writer
3 August - George Rice, Lord Lieutenant and MP for Carmarthenshire, 55
9 August - Morgan Rhys, hymn-writer, 63
11 December - "Madam" Bridget Bevan, philanthropist, 81
December - Richard Morris, collector of folk songs, 76date unknown'' - Edward Jones, composer, 49/50

References

Wales
Wales